Iridin is an isoflavone, a type of flavonoid. It is the 7-glucoside of irigenin and can be isolated from several species of irises like orris root, Iris florentina or Iris versicolor, also commonly known as the larger blue flag. It can also be found in Iris kemaonensis.

The compound is toxic and these plants have been mentioned as causing poisoning in humans and animals.

References 

O-methylated isoflavones
Isoflavone glucosides
Hydroxymethyl compounds